Farida Abdulla Khan (born 7 December 1951) is currently  a professor in the Department of Educational Studies at Jamia Millia Islamia (JMI), Delhi, India. She is also the managing editor of Contemporary Dialogue in Education by Sage. Earlier, She was a former Dean of Education at JMI.

Farida Khan earned a PhD in developmental psychology and has taught in many institutes, including Delhi University and Jawaharlal Nehru University (JNU). In 2011, she was appointed as a member of the Task Force on Research and Evaluation by National Advisory Council. Since 2013, she has also been a member of the National Commission for Minorities. She actively writes on Kashmir issues and educational issues of backward communities and minorities.

See also
 List of Jamia Millia Islamia people

References

1951 births
Living people
Academic staff of Jamia Millia Islamia
People from Punjab, India
Panjab University alumni
City University of New York alumni
University of Paris alumni

Scholars from Punjab, India